Grand Colombier (el. 1534 m) is a mountain in the Ain department in eastern France.

It lies in the area of Bugey.

This summit dominates the upper valley of the Rhône and the Lake of Bourget in the Savoie department and the commune of Culoz which lies at its feet. From the Grand Colombier, hiking and mountain biking trails lead over the mountains of Bugey in the direction of the plateau of Retord and have views of the Alps. The Col du Grand Colombier is one of the steepest passes in France, with a 20-percent gradient on the Bugey side.

Mountains of Ain